The American Champion Male Turf Horse award is an American Thoroughbred horse racing honor. 
The award originated in 1953 when the Daily Racing Form (DRF) named Iceberg II their champion. The Thoroughbred Racing Association (TRA) added the category in 1967. The organisations disagreed only once, in 1968.
In 1971 it became part of the Eclipse Awards program and is awarded annually to a Colt or Gelding, regardless of age, for their performance on grass race courses.

The Daily Racing Form, the Thoroughbred Racing Associations, and the National Turf Writers Association all joined forces in 1971 to create the Eclipse Award. From 1953 through 1978 it was awarded to male or female horses although the only female champion was Dahlia in 1974. In 1979 an individual category was created for each of the sexes.

Starting with the 2015 Eclipse Awards it is no longer possible for a Champion Male Turf Horse to also win Champion Older Male Horse, as the latter category is now restricted to horses proficient in dirt or main track races. The last such winner of both awards was Main Sequence in 2014.

Records
Most wins:
 4 – John Henry (1980, 1981, 1983, 1984)

Most wins by a trainer:
 6 – Ron McAnally (1980, 1981, 1983, 1984, 1991, 1995)

Most wins by an owner:
 4 – Dotsam Stable (1980, 1981, 1983, 1984)
 4 – Rokeby Stable (1967, 1968, 1970, 1971)
 4 – Godolphin Racing (1999, 2001, 2021, 2022)

Honorees

Eclipse awards

Daily Racing Form, Turf & Sport Digest and Thoroughbred Racing Association Awards

References

 The Eclipse Awards at the Thoroughbred Racing Associations of America, Inc.
 The Bloodhorse.com Champion's history charts

Horse racing awards
Horse racing in the United States